Victor Herrera might refer to:

Víctor Herrera (cyclist) (b. 1970), Colombian track and road cyclist
Víctor Herrera (footballer) (b. 1980), Panamanian football (soccer) player